The Mediatrix Telecom basketball team represented the Philippines in the 15th FIBA Asia Champions Cup held from May 15 to May 22, 2004 in Sharjah, United Arab Emirates.

Local Competition 
The team participated in the 2004 National Basketball Conference Invitatonal Cup held from February 23 to 29, 2004 wherein they emerged champions.

Competition in the FIBA-Asia Champions Cup 

Coached by Moses Nelson Kallos and assisted by long-time Philippine Basketball Association referee Igmidio Cahanding Mediatrix Telecom finished 10th among 10 competing teams.. It was the worst finish for a Philippine club team in the Champions Cup.

Roster

References 

National Basketball Conference teams